Wapping Dock railway station was on the Liverpool Overhead Railway, adjacent to the dock of the same name. It was primarily used for access to the large warehouses nearby.

It was opened on 6 March 1893 by the Marquis of Salisbury. The station received some damage during the Liverpool Blitz.

The station closed, along with the rest of the line on 31 December 1956. No evidence of this station remains, save for a small number of supporting columns set into the walls at Wapping.

References

External links
Wapping Dock railway station at Disused Stations

Disused railway stations in Liverpool
Former Liverpool Overhead Railway stations
Railway stations in Great Britain opened in 1893
Railway stations in Great Britain closed in 1956